Zemlianky may refer to several places in Ukraine:

 Zemlianky, Donetsk Oblast
 Zemlianky, Chuhuiv Raion, Kharkiv Oblast
 Zemlianky, Krasnohrad Raion, Kharkiv Oblast
 Zemlianky, Poltava Oblast